Carlos Otto Junge (1887, Concepción, Chile – 1978, Germany) was a Chilean–German chess master.

He was Chilean Champion in 1922. The Junge family moved from Chile to Germany in 1930. They lived in Hamburg, and played (father and son) in Hamburger Schachklub in 1930s. Carlos Otto Junge became a member of NSDAP (German Nazi Party) in 1932. He was the father of Klaus Junge. 

Dr Otto Junge was a chairman of Allgemeiner Turn- und Sportverein Cuxhaven in 1930-39, 1944–45, 1947-53.

References

1887 births
1978 deaths
Chilean chess players
German chess players
Chilean emigrants to Germany
Chilean people of German descent
People from Concepción, Chile